CSS Albemarle was a steam-powered casemate ironclad ram of the Confederate Navy (and later the second Albemarle of the United States Navy), named for an estuary in North Carolina which was named for General George Monck, the first Duke of Albemarle and one of the original Carolina Lords Proprietor.

Construction
On 16 April 1862, the Confederate Navy Department, enthusiastic about the offensive potential of armored rams following the victory of their first ironclad ram  (the rebuilt USS Merrimack) over the wooden-hulled Union blockaders in Hampton Roads, Virginia, signed a contract with nineteen-year-old detached Confederate Lieutenant Gilbert Elliott of Elizabeth City, North Carolina; he was to oversee the construction of a smaller but still powerful gunboat to destroy the Union warships in the North Carolina sounds. These men-of-war had enabled Union troops to hold strategic positions that controlled eastern North Carolina.

Since the terms of the agreement gave Elliott freedom to select an appropriate place to build the ram, he established a primitive shipyard, with the assistance of plantation owner Peter Smith, in a cornfield up the Roanoke River at a place called Edward's Ferry, near modern Scotland Neck, North Carolina; Smith was appointed the superintendent of construction. There, the water was too shallow to permit the approach of Union gunboats that otherwise would have destroyed the ironclad while still on its ways. Using detailed sketches provided by Elliott, the Confederate Navy's Chief Constructor John L. Porter finalized the gunboat's design, giving the ram an armored casemate with eight sloping, 30-degree angle sides. Within this thick-walled bunker were two  Brooke pivot rifles, one forward, the other aft, each capable of firing from three different fixed positions. Both cannons were protected on all sides behind six exterior-mounted, heavy iron shutters.

Construction of the ironclad began in January 1863 and continued on during the next year. Word of the gunboat reached the Union naval officers stationed in the region, raising an alarm. They appealed to the War Department for an overland expedition to destroy the ship, to be christened Albemarle after the body of water into which the Roanoke emptied, but the Union Army never felt it could spare the troops needed to carry out such a mission; it was a decision that would prove to be very short-sighted.

Ordnance and projectiles
Both cannons were positioned along the ironclad's center-line in the armored casemate, one forward, the other aft. The field of fire for both pivot rifles was 180-degrees, from port to starboard: each cannon could fire from one of three gun ports, allowing Albemarle to deliver a two cannon broadside. Albemarles projectiles consisted of explosive shells, anti-personnel canister shot, grape shot, and blunt-nosed, solid wrought iron "bolts" for use against Union armored ships. These were an early attempt at armor-piercing shot; solid iron like a typical solid shot, but elongated rather than spherical, giving far more weight for an equal frontal area than a traditional round ball, and thus greater penetration. Such projectiles could not be effectively fired from a traditional smoothbore naval gun, as the lack of stability would cause the shot to tumble in flight.

Service on the Roanoke River
In April 1864 the newly commissioned Confederate States Steamer Albemarle, under the command of Captain James W. Cooke, got underway down-river toward Plymouth, North Carolina; its mission was to clear the river of all Union vessels so that General Robert F. Hoke's troops could storm the forts located there. She anchored about three miles (5 km) above the town, and the pilot, John Lock, set off with two seamen in a small boat to take soundings. The river was high and they discovered ten feet of water over the obstructions that the Union forces had placed in the Thoroughfare Gap. Captain Cooke immediately ordered steam and, by keeping to the middle of the channel, they passed safely over the obstructions. The ironclad's armor protected them from the Union guns of the forts at Warren's Neck and Boyle's Mill.

After the fall of Plymouth, the U. S. Navy raised and temporarily hull-patched the Confederate ram. Near the end of the war, the Union gunboat  towed Albemarle to the Norfolk Navy Yard, where she arrived on 27 April 1865. On 7 June orders were issued to repair her hull, and she entered dry dock soon thereafter. The work was completed on 14 August 1865. Two weeks later, the ironclad was judged condemned by a Washington, D.C. prize court.

She saw no active naval service after being placed in ordinary at Norfolk, where she remained until she was finally sold at public auction on 15 October 1867 to J. N. Leonard and Company. She was probably scrapped for salvage. One of her  double-banded Brooke rifled cannon is on display at the Headquarters of the Commander U. S. Fleet Forces Command at the Norfolk, Virginia, naval base. Her smokestack is on display at the Museum of the Albemarle in Elizabeth City, North Carolina. Her bell is on display at the Port o' Plymouth Museum in Plymouth, North Carolina.

Prize Court Adjudication

Replica

A 3/8 scale  replica of Albemarle has been at anchor near the Port O' Plymouth Museum in Plymouth, North Carolina since April 2002. The replica is self-powered and capable of sailing on the river. Each year, the replica takes to the water during Living History Weekend in the last weekend of April.

See also

 Ships captured in the American Civil War
 Bibliography of American Civil War naval history

Notes

References

External links

 American Civil War Web Site
 Confederate States Navy Research Center Mobile, Ala.
 John Mercer Brooke

Ironclad warships of the Confederate States Navy
Ships built in North Carolina
1860s ships
Shipwrecks of the American Civil War
Shipwrecks in rivers
Ships captured by the United States Navy from the Confederate States Navy
Maritime incidents in October 1864
Raids of the American Civil War
George Monck, 1st Duke of Albemarle